KHGA (103.9 FM, "103.9 The Hog") is a country music radio station licensed to Earle, Arkansas, United States. The station is owned by Catherine Joanna Flinn.

References

External links

HGA (FM)
Radio stations established in 2005
2005 establishments in Arkansas
Country radio stations in the United States